Timothy John Costelloe SDB (born 3 February 1954) is an Australian prelate of the Catholic Church. He is the ninth archbishop of the Archdiocese of Perth, appointed in February 2012.

Life and ministry
Educated in Melbourne at St Peter's East Bentleigh and Salesian College, Chadstone, Costelloe commenced teacher training at Christ College, Melbourne, before joining the Salesians of Don Bosco in 1977. He graduated from Christ College in 1978. Professed as a Salesian in 1985, Costelloe was ordained as a priest on 25 October 1986 by Archbishop Sir Frank Little in Melbourne.

After three years at Salesian College, Chadstone, he was transferred to Rome where he completed a Licentiate in Sacred Theology at the Salesian Pontifical University in 1991. On his return to Melbourne, Costelloe began lecturing in theology at Catholic Theological College in Melbourne. Transferred to Perth in 1996, Costelloe served as parish priest St Joachim's Victoria Park and lectured at the University of Notre Dame Australia, Fremantle. He completed his doctorate in theology from the Melbourne College of Divinity. He returned to Melbourne in 1999, was appointed as rector to the Salesian community, and resumed teaching commitments at the Catholic Theological College. He was appointed as parish priest of St John the Baptist's Clifton Hill in 2006 and as parish priest of the adjoining St Joseph'sCollingwood in 2007. During this period he also held a number of senior positions in the Salesian order.

Episcopate
In April 2007, Costelloe was appointed an auxiliary bishop of Melbourne and Titular Bishop of Cluain Iraird. He was consecrated on 15 June 2007 by Denis Hart (Archbishop of Melbourne), with Cardinal George Pell (Archbishop of Sydney) and Ambrose De Paoli (Titular Bishop of Lares, apostolic nuncio to Australia) as co-consecrators.

With a strong interest in Catholic education, Costelloe held a number of senior roles in the Melbourne archdiocese, including being the episcopal vicar for tertiary education and the chair of the Catholic Education Commission of Victoria. An adjunct professor at the Australian Catholic University, he is also a member of the Australian Catholic Bishops Conference Commission for Catholic Education.

In February 2012 it was announced that Costelloe would succeed Barry Hickey as Archbishop of Perth; and on 21 March 2012 he was installed as archbishop in a liturgical ceremony at St Mary's Cathedral, Perth.

References

External links

1954 births
Living people
Australian Roman Catholic bishops
Australian people of Irish descent
Religious leaders from Melbourne
Roman Catholic archbishops of Perth
Salesians of Don Bosco
Salesian bishops
People educated at Salesian College (Chadstone)